Ultimo minuto (also known as The Last Minute) is a 1987 Italian comedy-drama film directed by Pupi Avati. The film won the David di Donatello for best sound (to Raffaele De Luca) and for best original song (to Riz Ortolani).

Cast 
 Ugo Tognazzi: Walter Ferroni
 Elena Sofia Ricci: Marta Ferroni
 Diego Abatantuono: Duccio Venturi
 Massimo Bonetti: Emilio Boschi
 Lino Capolicchio: Renzo Di Carlo
 Giovanna Maldotti: Egle Di Carlo
 Marco Leporatti: Di Carlo's son
 Luigi Diberti: Claudio Corti
 Nik Novecento: Nik
 Cesare Barbetti: Lele Costanzi
 Cinzia De Ponti: Boschi's wife
 Marco Leonardi: Paolo Tassoni

References

External links

1987 films
Italian sports comedy-drama films
Commedia all'italiana
Films directed by Pupi Avati
Italian association football films
1987 comedy-drama films
Films scored by Riz Ortolani
1987 comedy films
1987 drama films
1980s sports comedy-drama films
1980s Italian films